John Irving (5 October 1766 – 10 November 1845) was an Irish landowner, industrialist and MP.

Life 
He was the proprietor of the Magheramorne estate in County Antrim in the 19th century and was an improving landlord who encouraged tenants to improve the land through provision of lime for fertilisation, and incentives for those who drained and erected ditches. He also built a row of labourer's cottages which had two acres attached to each to encourage self-sufficiency. 

Irving majored in developing what was then known as Ballylig Lime Works, building quays and a railway, and expanding the production. In 1834 130,000 barrels of lime were exported at 10d per barrel, amounting to over £5400. 300 tons of limestone was exported, valued at £22 and 624 tons of flint amounting to a value of £140. Ships traded with County Down, the Clyde, Liverpool, Kintyre and other areas. Flints from Magheramorne quarries were used in the Staffordshire Potteries. Irving died in London in November 1845. His agent at Magheramorne was Thomas Maxwell, who lived at Ballylig House.

The lime works which were established by Irving became the British Portland Cement Company Plant, and subsequently Blue Circle. The cement plant closed at Magheramorne some years ago, but there are plans to develop major adventure park activities at the quarry workings at Magheramorne.

Irving was a Member of the Parliament of the United Kingdom for Bramber, a rotten borough in Sussex, England, 1806-1832 and following its abolition in 1832, for Antrim, 1837-1845

References

External links 
 

1766 births
1845 deaths
People from County Antrim
Members of the Parliament of the United Kingdom for English constituencies
UK MPs 1806–1807
UK MPs 1807–1812
UK MPs 1812–1818
UK MPs 1818–1820
UK MPs 1820–1826
UK MPs 1826–1830
UK MPs 1830–1831
UK MPs 1831–1832
Members of the Parliament of the United Kingdom for County Antrim constituencies (1801–1922)
UK MPs 1837–1841
UK MPs 1841–1847
Irish Conservative Party MPs